At a municipal population of  as of April 1, 2018, and a metropolitan population of  as of July 1, 2016, Calgary is both the largest city and largest metropolitan area in the Canadian province of Alberta. Standing at 56 stories, the tallest building in the city is Brookfield Place. The second-tallest building in the city is The Bow, standing at 52-storeys, . The third-tallest building in the city is the 50-storey,  Telus Sky, which surpassed the  Suncor Energy Centre upon its completion in 2020. The Calgary Tower is included in this list for comparison purposes; however, it is not ranked since it is not considered a habitable building.

Calgary's history of towers began with the Grain Exchange Building (1910), the Fairmont Palliser Hotel (1914), and the Elveden Centre. Building construction remained slow in the city until the early 1970s. From 1970 to 1990, Calgary witnessed a major expansion of skyscraper and high-rise construction. Many of the city's office towers were completed during this period, such as the First Canadian Centre and the Canterra Tower office towers. A ten-year lull in building construction came after the expansion, though Calgary experienced a larger second building expansion beginning in the late 90s and continuing into the present. Currently, the city has height restrictions that prevent any building from casting a shadow over the Bow River and the city hall, however, winter months are excluded from this limit. There is no other imposed limits elsewhere in the city, which could allow for some extremely tall buildings. The Bow Tower was originally proposed to be at least 1,000 feet tall but reduced to comply with these rules. This is the second highest concentration of skyscrapers in Canada, behind Downtown Toronto.

, there are 10 skyscrapers over  under construction, along with another 34 skyscrapers over  approved and proposed, with a further 56 high-rises over  under construction, approved for construction, and proposed for construction in the City of Calgary. After this skyscraper boom, Calgary's skyline will have dramatically changed, having added at least the second tallest and fourth tallest buildings in Western Canada between 2016 and 2018, Brookfield Place East and Telus Sky respectively.

Buildings

This includes spires and architectural details but does not include antenna masts. Freestanding observation and/or telecommunication towers, while not habitable buildings, are included for comparison purposes; however, they are not ranked. One such tower is the Calgary Tower.

Towers

(*) Although Calgary's two largest structures are actually CFCN-TV's twin communication towers, they are not self-supporting and are assisted by cables (guyed). This is not unlike most stand-alone communications antennae.

Historic towers

Projects
The following is a list of buildings that are under construction, approved, or proposed in Calgary that are planned to rise at least  .

Under construction

Approved

Proposed/on-hold

Timeline of tallest buildings
This lists buildings that once held the title of tallest building in Calgary. Although it is not a building, the Calgary Tower was the city's tallest free standing structure from 1968 until 1983 when it was surpassed by the Suncor Energy Centre's West tower.

Other buildings

See also

 List of attractions and landmarks in Calgary
 List of tallest buildings in Alberta
 List of tallest buildings in Canada
 List of tallest buildings in Edmonton
 Architecture of Canada

References

Calgary
 
 
Buildings, Tallest
Tallest buildings in Calgary